The 39a Targa Florio took place on 16 October, around the Circuito delle Madonie Piccolo, (Sicily, Italy).  It was also the sixth and final round of the F.I.A. World Sports Car Championship. The title lay between Ferrari, Jaguar and Mercedes-Benz, with Ferrari leading 19 points to 16 from the other two marques.

Report

Entry

A grand total of 65 racing cars were registered for this event, of which 64 arrived for practice and qualifying. Scuderia Ferrari entered a pair of Ferrari 750 Monzas for Carroll Shelby and Gino Munaron, and Umberto Maglioli and Sergio Sighinolfi, alongside a 860 Monza for the partnership of Eugenio Castellotti and Robert Manzon. One of their closest championship rivals, Jaguar, did not enter not all, leaving it to just one locally entered Jaguar XK120 to take up to the fight. Meanwhile, Officine Alfieri Maserati sent a total of six works cars across the Strait of Messina to keep their very slim championship hopes alive. Amongst their line-up was Luigi Musso, Giorgio Scarlatti and Franco Bordoni.

The third marque chasing the title, Daimler-Benz AG entered three of their Mercedes-Benz 300SLRs to tackle the 44.64 mile circuit. They had decided to quit racing at the end of the 1955 season, but one last major attempt was made to wrest the World Sports Car Championship away from Ferrari. The cars were to be driven by Juan Manuel Fangio and Karl Kling, Stirling Moss and Peter Collins, and John Fitch with former Jaguar driver, Desmond Titterington.

Race

The race was held over 13 laps of the 44.64 miles of the Circuito delle Madonie Piccolo, giving a distance of 581.604 miles. Each team of drivers was expected to navigate approximately 10,000 curves during almost 10 hours of driving combined. The Daimler team manager, Alfred Neubauer was planning on each driver being able to run four lap stints.

The first car, an Alfa Romeo 1900 TI started off at 07:00, with subsequent cars departing every 30 seconds. The first of the main competitors, the Ferrari 750 Monza driven by Luigi Piotti and Franco Cornacchia would leave at 07:24:30. Very quickly, Moss set a blistering pace and broke the track record by two and a half minutes. Although his Mercedes was one of the last to be flagged off, he had passed everyone by the end of lap one.

Castellotti's Ferrari split the Mercedes of Moss and Fangio. At the end of the fourth lap Castellotti was in first place and Moss was in a ditch. Moss had crashed but the Mercedes was still in working order if slightly bruised. After help from some spectators Moss was back on the road but now in fourth place. Collins exchanged places with Moss and took up the chase. Fangio passed the leading Ferrari and handed his car to Kling. Mercedes were now in first, third and fourth. The Mercedes of Moss and Collins would certainly have its fair share of obvious moments, scattered all around the car’s body. Still, it was going very fast. The area around the headlights were badly damaged, front corners on both sides were stripped away. And the right side panel looked as though they had had a number of encounters with buildings as the two Englishmen pushed the 300SLR hard through the Sicilian countryside.

On one occasion, Moss pushed at a bit too hard and would go careening off the side of the track. The car avoided heavy damage, and with the help of some local spectators, Moss would rejoin the race, still leading. Trouble struck again when Collins drove straight up a stone wall, his front wheels spinning in the air. Fortunately he was able to put his car in reverse and rejoined the battle. Collins worked his way up to first before returning the car to Moss.
 
Moss drove the only way that he knew how and won going away or in the words of Peter Collins "despite Stirling's efforts and my own to write the machine off!" Mercedes won the race and with it the sports car championship only to quit racing for the second time.

As a result, car number 104 (Daimler-Benz AG), took an impressive victory, winning in a time of 9hrs 43.14 mins., averaging a speed of 59.832 mph. Second place went to Fangio and Kling, for the second race in a row, 4mins and 41 seconds adrift. The podium was complete by the Ferrari 857 S of Castellotti and Manzon, a further 5mins 25 behind. Meanwhile, the third Mercedes of Titterington and Fitch were fourth. Next home was the first of the Maserati’s, in hand of Carlos Manzini and Francesco Giardini.

Official Classification

Class Winners are in Bold text.

 Fastest Lap: Stirling Moss, 43:07.400secs (62.248 mph)

Class Winners

Standings after the race

 Note: Only the top five positions are included in this set of standings.
Championship points were awarded for the first six places in each race in the order of 8-6-4-3-2-1. Manufacturers were only awarded points for their highest finishing car with no points awarded for positions filled by additional cars. Only the best 4 results out of the 7 races could be retained by each manufacturer. Points earned but not counted towards the championship totals are listed within brackets in the above table.

References

Further reading

 Ed Heuvink. Targa Florio: 1955-1973. Reinhard Klein. 
 R. M. Clarke. Targa Florio: The Porsche and Ferrari Years, 1955-1964. Brooklands Books Ltd. 

Targa Florio
Targa Florio
Targa Florio